Thomas Langrell Harris (October 29, 1816 – November 24, 1858) was a soldier in the United States Army and U.S. Representative from Illinois. Harris was decorated for bravery at the Battle of Cerro Gordo during the Mexican–American War, and served in Congress as a Democrat.

Early life
Born in Norwich, Connecticut, Harris pursued classical studies and was graduated from Washington (now Trinity) College, Hartford, Connecticut, in 1841 where he studied law.

Early career
He was admitted to the bar in 1842 and commenced practice in Petersburg, Illinois. He was made School commissioner for Menard County in 1845.

Military service
During the Mexican–American War, he raised and commanded a company and joined the Fourth Regiment, Illinois Volunteer Infantry. Harris was subsequently elected major of the regiment. Whilst absent and with the US Army, Harris was elected a member of the State senate in 1846. He was presented with a sword by the State of Illinois for gallantry at the Battle of Cerro Gordo, Mexico.

Later political career
Harris was elected as a Democrat to the Thirty-first Congress (March 4, 1849 – March 3, 1851). He was an unsuccessful candidate for reelection in 1850 to the Thirty-second Congress. He was not a candidate in 1852.

Harris was elected to the Thirty-fourth Congress and Thirty-fifth Congresses and served from March 4, 1855, until his death. He served as chairman of the Committee on Expenditures in the Department of the Navy (Thirty-fourth Congress), Committee on Elections (Thirty-fifth Congress) and was re-elected to the Thirty-sixth Congress.

Harristown Township, Macon County, Illinois and the Village of Harristown [formerly Summit] were named in his honor.

Death
Harris died in Springfield, Illinois, November 24, 1858, and is interred in Rose Hill Cemetery, Petersburg, Illinois.  He has a cenotaph at the Congressional Cemetery in Washington, DC.

See also
 List of United States Congress members who died in office (1790–1899)

References

1816 births
1858 deaths
People from Petersburg, Illinois
Politicians from Norwich, Connecticut
Illinois lawyers
School board members in Illinois
United States Army officers
American military personnel of the Mexican–American War
Democratic Party members of the United States House of Representatives from Illinois
19th-century American politicians
Military personnel from Norwich, Connecticut
19th-century American lawyers
Military personnel from Illinois